007 Villain Club by Swatch (also known as 007 Villain Collection by Swatch)is a promotional EP distributed free on CD through Metro Magazine and Swatch the Club and as a free download through the Swatch, MTV and Yahoo websites.  It was released to promote Swatch's 007 Villains Collection line of watches.

Track listing

References

Leningrad Cowboys EPs
2008 EPs
Covers EPs
Albums free for download by copyright owner